Lee Bum-young (born 2 April 1989) is a South Korean footballer who currently plays as a goalkeeper for K League 1 club Suwon FC.

Club career 
Lee signed a professional contract for Busan IPark in 2008, and played as the second-choice goalkeeper for Busan during his early career. He became Busan's first-choice goalkeeper since 2013, but he transferred to J1 League club Avispa Fukuoka after Busan was relegated to the K League 2 in 2015.

International career 
Lee was selcected as a reserve goalkeeper for South Korean under-23 team for the 2012 Summer Olympics, and got opportunities after main goalkeeper Jung Sung-ryong was injured in the middle of the quarter-final match against Great Britain. He saved Daniel Sturridge's penalty in the penalty shoot-out of the quarter-final match, helping South Korea reach the semi-finals. He played as a starter for the first time in the next match against Brazil after his contribution. However, he conceded three goals to Brazil, losing the semi-final match. He couldn't appear in the bronze medal match due to his poor performance against Brazil.

Lee was included in South Korea's squad for the 2014 FIFA World Cup, but didn't play. He made his senior international debut against Uruguay on 8 September 2014.

Personal life
Lee's younger brother Lee Bum-soo is also a goalkeeper.

Career statistics

Club

Honours
Busan IPark
Korean FA Cup runner-up: 2010
Korean League Cup runner-up: 2009, 2011

South Korea U23
Summer Olympics bronze medal: 2012
Asian Games bronze medal: 2010

South Korea 
EAFF Championship: 2015

References

External links 

 

 
 

1989 births
Living people
Association football goalkeepers
South Korean footballers
Busan IPark players
Gangwon FC players
Avispa Fukuoka players
Jeonbuk Hyundai Motors players
Suwon FC players
K League 1 players
J1 League players
Footballers from Seoul
Footballers at the 2012 Summer Olympics
Olympic footballers of South Korea
Olympic medalists in football
Olympic bronze medalists for South Korea
Medalists at the 2012 Summer Olympics
2014 FIFA World Cup players
Asian Games medalists in football
Footballers at the 2010 Asian Games
Asian Games bronze medalists for South Korea
Medalists at the 2010 Asian Games
South Korea international footballers